Stenomelania costellaris is a species of freshwater snail, an aquatic gastropod mollusc in the family Thiaridae.

Distribution 
The type locality is "small streams in the islands of Negros, Tanhay, Siquijor; Philippines".

References

External links 

Thiaridae
Gastropods described in 1851